Alexander "Petey" Rosenberg (April 7, 1918–June 29, 1997) was an American professional basketball player.

A 5'10" guard from Saint Joseph's University, Rosenberg played one season in the Basketball Association of America as a member of the Philadelphia Warriors.  He averaged 2.9 points per game and won a league championship.

BAA career statistics

Regular season

Playoffs

External links

1918 births
1997 deaths
American men's basketball players
Guards (basketball)
Philadelphia Sphas players
Philadelphia Warriors players
Saint Joseph's Hawks men's basketball players
Basketball players from Philadelphia
20th-century American Jews
South Philadelphia High School alumni